The Renault 40CV was a full-size luxury car produced by the French vehicle manufacturer Renault from 1911 to 1928.

It was sold in many variations which were known by two letter names such as the CG, ES and JP. Originally launched with a 6-cylinder 7.5-litre engine, this was replaced by a larger 9.1-litre  engine when the "Type HF" version of the 40CV replaced the "Type HD" version in August 1920.  In 1922 the 40CV was fitted with a hydraulic servo-brake system.  The 40 CV was replaced by the Renault Reinastella in 1928.

Between 1920 and 1928 the Renault 40CV served as official transport for French presidents Alexandre Millerand and Gaston Doumergue, replacing a role previously filled by the Panhard 20CV.

References

40CV
Cars introduced in 1911